Eduardo Rodríguez (20 March 1918 – 25 March 2000) was an Argentine footballer. He played in three matches for the Argentina national football team from 1943 to 1945. He was also part of Argentina's squad for the 1946 South American Championship.

References

External links
 

1918 births
2000 deaths
Argentine footballers
Argentina international footballers
Place of birth missing
Association football defenders
Estudiantes de La Plata footballers
Club Atlético River Plate footballers
Unión de Santa Fe footballers
Deportivo Cali footballers
Argentine expatriate footballers
Expatriate footballers in Colombia